Blue Division may refer to one of the following:

Blue Division (Second French Empire), the nickname given to the first naval division, formed in 1870, merging the naval artillery and naval infantry
Blue Division, a unit of Spanish volunteers that served on the German side of the Second World War, mainly on the Eastern Front
Irish Brigade (Spanish Civil War), Irish fascist volunteers who fought on the Falangist side in the Spanish Civil War and nicknamed the Blue Division
392nd (Croatian) Infantry Division, a volunteer division in Wehrmacht during World War Two recruited from the Independent State of Croatia, nicknamed the Blue Division by its men